Hristofor Hubchev (Bulgarian: Христофор Хубчев; born 24 November 1995) is a Bulgarian footballer who plays as a defender for Bulgarian First League club Pirin Blagoevgrad. He is the nephew of Petar Hubchev.

Career
On 22 June 2014, Hubchev joined Montana.

On 18 June 2016, Hubchev joined Beroe Stara Zagora, but was released on 2 December 2016 without a single appearance in a league game.

Career statistics

References

External links

1995 births
Living people
Footballers from Madrid
Bulgarian footballers
Association football defenders
Bulgaria youth international footballers
Bulgaria under-21 international footballers
Bulgarian expatriate footballers
First Professional Football League (Bulgaria) players
Super League Greece players
FC Montana players
PFC Beroe Stara Zagora players
FC Dunav Ruse players
Athlitiki Enosi Larissa F.C. players
SFC Etar Veliko Tarnovo players
PFC Levski Sofia players
Bulgarian expatriate sportspeople in Greece
Expatriate footballers in Greece